Letea Veche is a commune in Bacău County, Western Moldavia, Romania. It is composed of five villages: Holt, Letea Veche, Radomirești, Ruși-Ciutea and Siretu.

References

Communes in Bacău County
Localities in Western Moldavia